Rüdiger Wassibauer (born 3 October 1948) is an Austrian equestrian. He competed at the 1972 Summer Olympics and the 1976 Summer Olympics.

References

1948 births
Living people
Austrian male equestrians
Olympic equestrians of Austria
Equestrians at the 1972 Summer Olympics
Equestrians at the 1976 Summer Olympics
Sportspeople from Salzburg